The 26th Academy Awards were held on March 25, 1954, simultaneously at the RKO Pantages Theatre in Hollywood (hosted by Fredric March), and the NBC Century Theatre in New York City (hosted by Donald O'Connor).

The second national telecast of the Awards show drew an estimated 43 million viewers. Shirley Booth, appearing in a play in Philadelphia, presented the Academy Award for Best Actor through a live broadcast cut-in, having privately received the winner's name over the telephone from O'Connor. Gary Cooper pre-recorded his presentation of the Academy Award for Best Actress while on location in Mexico shooting Garden of Evil, with O'Connor then announcing the winner's name live.

All the major winners in this year were black-and-white films. Fred Zinnemann's From Here to Eternity won eight awards from its thirteen nominations: Best Picture, Best Supporting Actor, Best Supporting Actress, Academy Award for Best Director, Best Screenplay (Daniel Taradash), Best Cinematography, Black-and-White (Burnett Guffey), Best Sound Recording, and Best Film Editing. It was the third film to receive five acting nominations. Its eight awards matched the record set by Gone with the Wind in 1939. Walt Disney won four awards, a record to this day for most Oscars won by a single person in the same year (the record was tied by Bong Joon Ho at the 92nd Academy Awards).

William Holden's acceptance speech for Best Actor for Stalag 17 was simply "Thank You", making it one of the shortest speeches on record, forced by the TV broadcast's strict cutoff time. Holden, frustrated, later personally paid for advertisements in the Hollywood trade publications to thank everyone he had wanted to in his speech, as well as remarking that he felt that either Burt Lancaster or Montgomery Clift should have won the Oscar for From Here to Eternity instead of him.

Awards

Nominees were announced on February 15, 1954. Winners are listed first and highlighted in boldface.

Academy Honorary Awards
 Pete Smith – "For his witty and pungent observations on the American scene in his series of 'Pete Smith Specialties.
 Twentieth Century-Fox Film Corporation – "In recognition of their imagination, showmanship and foresight in introducing the revolutionary process known as CinemaScope".
 Joseph I. Breen – "For his conscientious, open-minded and dignified management of the Motion Picture Production Code".
 Bell and Howell Company – "For their pioneering and basic achievements in the advancement of the motion picture industry".
 The War of the Worlds for Best Special Effects.

Irving G. Thalberg Memorial Award
 George Stevens

Academy Award of Merit
 Henri Chretien for Cinemascope contribution

Presenters and performers

Presenters
Elizabeth Taylor and Michael Wilding – Presenters of the Documentary Awards
Jack Webb – Presenter of the award for Best Sound Recording
Keefe Brasselle and Marilyn Erskine – Presenters of the Short Subject Awards
Esther Williams – Presenter of the award for Best Film Editing
Gene Tierney – Presenter of the awards for Costume Design
Gower Champion and Marge Champion – Presenters of the award for Art Direction
Lex Barker and Lana Turner – Presenters of the awards for Cinematography
Kirk Douglas – Presenter of the Writing awards
Irene Dunne – Presenter of the award for Best Director
Walter Brennan – Presenter of the award for Best Supporting Actress
Mercedes McCambridge – Presenter of the award for Best Supporting Actor
Arthur Freed – Presenter of the Music awards
Gary Cooper – Presenter of the award for Best Actress
Shirley Booth – Presenter of the award for Best Actor
Cecil B. DeMille – Presenter of the award for Best Motion Picture
Merle Oberon – Presenter of the award for Best Special Effects
Charles Brackett – Presenter of the Honorary Awards
Tyrone Power – Presenter of the Scientific & Technical Awards
David O. Selznick – Presenter of the Irving G. Thalberg Award

Performers
André Previn – Conductor the Academy Awards orchestra
Mitzi Gaynor and Donald O'Connor – Performers of "The Moon Is Blue" from The Moon Is Blue
Connie Russell – Performer of "Sadie Thompson's Song (Blue Pacific Blues)" from Miss Sadie Thompson
Ann Blyth – Performer of "Secret Love" from Calamity Jane
Dean Martin – Performer of "That's Amore" from The Caddy

Multiple nominations and awards

These films had multiple nominations:

 13 nominations: From Here to Eternity
 10 nominations: Roman Holiday
 6 nominations: Lili and Shane
 5 nominations: Julius Caesar and The Robe
 3 nominations: The Band Wagon, Calamity Jane, The Moon Is Blue, Stalag 17, and The War of the Worlds
 2 nominations: Above and Beyond, Call Me Madam, Knights of the Round Table, Martin Luther, Mogambo, The President's Lady, Titanic, and Young Bess

The following films received multiple awards.

 8 wins: From Here to Eternity
 3 wins: Roman Holiday
 2 wins: The Robe

See also
11th Golden Globe Awards
1953 in film
 5th Primetime Emmy Awards
 6th Primetime Emmy Awards
 7th British Academy Film Awards
 8th Tony Awards

Notes

References

Academy Awards ceremonies
1953 film awards
1953 awards in the United States
1954 in Los Angeles
1954 in New York City
1954 in American cinema
March 1954 events in the United States
Events in New York City
1950s in Manhattan